Gutsal Ridge (‘Gutsalski Hrebet’ \'gu-tsal-ski 'hre-bet\) is the ice-covered ridge extending 10.4 km in northwest-southeast direction and rising to 1574 m (Trambesh Peak) on the southeast side of Stribog Mountains on Brabant Island in the Palmer Archipelago, Antarctica. The southeast half of the ridge has steep and partly ice-free southwest slopes. It surmounts Hippocrates Glacier to the southwest and Balanstra Glacier to the northeast.

The ridge is named after the settlement of Gutsal in Western Bulgaria.

Location
British mapping in 1980 and 2008.

Maps
 Antarctic Digital Database (ADD). Scale 1:250000 topographic map of Antarctica. Scientific Committee on Antarctic Research (SCAR). Since 1993, regularly upgraded and updated.
British Antarctic Territory. Scale 1:200000 topographic map. DOS 610 Series, Sheet W 64 62. Directorate of Overseas Surveys, Tolworth, UK, 1980.
Brabant Island to Argentine Islands. Scale 1:250000 topographic map. British Antarctic Survey, 2008.

Notes

References
 Bulgarian Antarctic Gazetteer. Antarctic Place-names Commission. (details in Bulgarian, basic data in English)
 Gutsal Ridge. SCAR Composite Antarctic Gazetteer.

External links
 Gutsal Ridge. Copernix satellite image

Mountains of the Palmer Archipelago
Bulgaria and the Antarctic